Admiral Rodgers may refer to:

Bertram J. Rodgers (1894–1983), U.S. Navy vice admiral 
Christopher Raymond Perry Rodgers (1819–1892), U.S. Navy rear admiral
Frederick Rodgers (1842–1917), U.S. Navy rear admiral
John Rodgers (admiral) (1812–1882), U.S. Navy rear admiral
Michael S. Rogers (born 1959), U.S. Navy admiral
Raymond P. Rodgers (1849–1925), U.S. Navy rear admiral
Thomas S. Rodgers (1858–1931), U.S. Navy rear admiral
William Ledyard Rodgers (1860–1944), U.S. Navy vice admiral

See also
John Rodgers (naval officer, born 1772) (1772–1838), U.S. Navy commodore (admiral equivalent rank)
Michael S. Rogers (born 1959), U.S. Navy admiral